A list of films produced in Pakistan in 1982 (see 1982 in film) and in the Urdu language:

1982

See also
1982 in Pakistan

References

External links
 Search Pakistani film - IMDB.com

1982
Pakistani
Films